This is a list of Santo Domingo Metro stations, excluding those that are abandoned, projected, planned, or under construction.

References

Santo Domingo